Hansan Island (한산도, 閑山島), also known as Hansando, is in South Gyeongsang Province across a relatively narrow strait from Chungmu on the Tongyeong Peninsula, South Korea.

History
The area around the island was the site of the Battle of Hansan Island during the Imjin War where Admiral Yi Sun-Sin decisively defeated the main Japanese war fleet led by Wakizaka Yasuharu. Following the battle, Admiral Yi moved his main naval base from Yeosu to Hansan Island, as it was strategically advantageous for conducting surveillance and reconnaissance of the nearby Gyeonnaeryang Strait 
(견내량, 見乃梁), which was an inland route leading directly to the main Japanese base located at Busan.

After King Seonjo ordered Admiral Yi Sun-Sin's arrest, imprisonment, and torture  Admiral Won Gyun was assigned to lead the Korean navy. However, Won Gyun attacked the Japanese base at Busan, ignoring the tides, and was forced to retreat owing to shelling from the shore. The Japanese navy pursued him relentlessly and sank all but thirteen of the Panokseon in the process. Won Gyun was killed during this disastrous retreat, and Hansan Island, and its evacuated naval base, was exposed to the Japanese forces, who eventually burned it down. After the war, Joseon naval base was reconstructed, Yi was rehabilitated, and went on to defeat the Japanese with the remaining 13 Panokseon.

Tourism
Oehang Village Pine Forest

References

Islands of South Gyeongsang Province
Tongyeong